Kay Kenyon (born July 2, 1956) is an American science fiction and fantasy writer currently living in Wenatchee, Washington. She wrote "The Entire and the Rose" and "Dark Talents" book series.

Publications 
The Seeds of Time (Bantam Spectra; 1997)
Leap Point (Bantam Spectra, 1998)
Rift (Bantam Spectra, 1999)
Tropic of Creation (Bantam Spectra, 2000)
Maximum Ice (Bantam UK, 2002; Philip K. Dick Award nominee, 2003)
The Braided World (Bantam UK, 2003; John W. Campbell Award nominee, 2004)

"The Entire and the Rose" 
Bright of the Sky (Pyr, 2007)
A World Too Near (Pyr, 2008)
City Without End (Pyr, 2009)
Prince of Storms (Pyr, 2010)

"Dark Talents" 
At the Table of Wolves (2017)
Serpent in the Heather (2018)
Nest of the Monarch (2019)

References

External links 
Kay Kenyon's Home Page
Locus Interview, June 30, 2009

People from Wenatchee, Washington
1956 births
Living people
American women novelists
American science fiction writers
Women science fiction and fantasy writers
21st-century American women